The pygmy scaly-tailed flying squirrel (Idiurus zenkeri) is a species of rodent in the family Anomaluridae. It is found in Cameroon, Central African Republic, Republic of the Congo, Democratic Republic of the Congo, Equatorial Guinea, and Uganda. Its natural habitat is subtropical or tropical moist lowland forests.

References

Dieterlen, F. 2005. Family Anomaluridae. Pp. 1532-1534 in Mammal Species of the World a Taxonomic and Geographic Reference. D. E. Wilson and D. M. Reeder eds. Johns Hopkins University Press, Baltimore.

pygmy scaly-tailed flying squirrel
Mammals of Cameroon
Mammals of the Democratic Republic of the Congo
pygmy scaly-tailed flying squirrel
Taxonomy articles created by Polbot